The Burundi national football team, nicknamed The Swallows, represents Burundi in international football and is controlled by the Football Federation of Burundi. The team has never qualified for the World Cup. Burundi previously did come very close to qualifying for the 1994 Africa Cup of Nations, losing only on penalties to Guinea in a playoff. However, in 2019, it qualified for the first time, and took part in the Africa Cup of Nations finals in Group B, but lost all its matches and left from the group stage without scoring a single goal.

History

Difficult beginnings (1974–1992)
The Burundi football team was created in 1971 by the Football Federation of Burundi. The Swallows' first match was in a 1976 African Cup of Nations qualification match against Somalia, which ended in a 2–0 victory. Following a 1–0 loss in the second leg, Burundi qualified to meet Egypt in the next round where they lost 5–0 on aggregate and were eliminated. It would be seventeen years before Burundi played another AFCON qualifying match. In their first twenty years, Burundi played in twenty fixtures and managed 6 wins, 2 draws and 12 defeats.

Narrowly missing qualification (1992–1998)
In 1992, Burundi entered the qualification rounds for the FIFA World Cup for the first time, but were eliminated in the first round following one win (1–0 against Ghana), one draw (0–0 against Algeria) and two losses in the reverse fixtures to finish bottom of the group. Burundi then finished joint top in their 1994 African Cup of Nations qualification group however they lost their play-off match against Guinea on penalties. Due to the Burundian Civil War, Burundi withdrew from the 1996 and 1998 AFCON qualifiers and, despite beating Sierra Leone 2–0 on aggregate and qualifying for the final round of the 1998 FIFA World Cup qualifiers, they withdrew again.

African Cup of Nations qualifiers (2000–2015)
Following successive withdrawals from the AFCON qualifiers, Burundi returned for the 2000 competition, beating Tanzania in the preliminary rounds before finishing third in their group behind Burkina Faso and Senegal. In the 2002 qualifiers, Burundi again advanced to the group stages of qualification by beating Djibouti (4–1), but finished last in their group with only two points. In 2004, Burundi performed even worse, collecting no points and finishing last behind South Africa and Ivory Coast. In 2008 Burundi finished five points behind leaders Egypt and didn't make it through to the next round. In 2012 Burundi were even further adrift, finishing thirteen points behind group winners Ivory Coast. For the 2013 qualifiers, Burundi failed to advance due to away goals against Zimbabwe (2–2), and in 2015 they lost to Botswana (1–0) .

FIFA World Cup qualifiers (2002–2014)
Burundi did not participate in the 2002 qualification process but re-entered in 2006, only to get knocked out by Gabon in the first round (4–1). In 2010, Burundi managed two victories, both against Seychelles but failed to go through behind Burkina Faso and Tunisia. The 2006 and 2010 qualifiers doubled as qualification for the FIFA World Cup and Africa Cup of Nations. The following qualification cycle, Burundi were eliminated by Lesotho in the first round (3–2).

First CAN qualification (2017–present)
After falling in the second qualifying round for the 2018 FIFA World Cup against DR Congo, Burundi focused on convincing Gaël Bigirimana and Saido Berahino to come and play for the selection, both playing in Europe (for Hibernian and Stoke City respectively). Both players agreed and Berahino scored on his debut to earn the team a 1–1 draw against Gabon. In March 2019, in the final group game, Burundi played a decisive match against Gabon needing only one point to qualify. The match ended in a draw (1–1), with a goal from Cédric Amissi earning Burundi their first opportunity to play in the Africa Cup of Nations. Burundi lost all three of their matches at the 2019 Africa Cup of Nations, failing to register a single goal.

Team image

Colours 
Traditionally, the Burundi team wears the three colours of its flag: red, green and white.

Sponsors
During these beginnings, Burundi is equipped by Erreà, an Italian sports brand. In 2012, he signed a contract with Adidas for a period of 10 years. Despite this long-term contract with Adidas, Burundi is committed in 2018 with Nike. She even signs a contract with Lumitel (a phone brand).

Stadium
The Burundi team have played most of their matches in Bujumbura at the Intwari Stadium. The second match in its history, Burundi is playing its first home match against Somalia (3–0 victory). The Prince Louis Rwagasore stadium is home to Vital'O FC and Prince Louis FC, as well as the national team. The stadium has been renovated several times, notably in March 2018, due to a flooded pitch.

Supporters
During the matches at the Prince Louis Rwagasore stadium, the Burundian supporters are often outnumbered, in particular because of the rather low capacity of the stadium (10,000 seats) for around 13,000 spectators. Just like the players, the supporters dress in red, green and white and bring the flag of the country. During the match in March 2019 against Gabon, the authorities have made additional seats available because of the lack of space in the stands.

Results and fixtures
The following is a list of match results in the last 12 months, as well as any future matches that have been scheduled.

2022

2023

Coaches

 Nikolay Yefimov (Until 1991)
 Baudouin Ribakare (1992)
 Aleksandr Rakitsky (1993–1996)
 Baudouin Ribakare (1997–2004)
 Adel Amrouche (2007–2012)
 Lofty Naseem (2012–2014)
 Rainer Willfeld (2014–2015)
 Ahcene Aït-Abdelmalek (2015–2016)
 Olivier Niyungeko (2016–2019)
 Joslin Bipfubusa (2020)
 Jimmy Ndayizeye (2020–2022)
 Etienne Ndayiragije (2023–)

Players

Current squad
The following 30 players were called up for the friendly match against Indonesia on 25 and 28 March 2023.

Caps and goals are correct as of 7 June 2022, after the match against .

Recent call-ups
The following players have been called up for Burundi in the last 12 months.

DEC Player refused to join the team after the call-up.
INJ Player withdrew from the squad due to an injury.
PRE Preliminary squad.
RET Player has retired from international football.
WIT Withdrew from the squad
SUS Suspended from the national team, red or yellow cards.

Player records

Players in bold are still active with Burundi.

Competitive record

World Cup record

Africa Cup of Nations record

African Nations Championship record

CECAFA Cup record

External links
Burundi Football Federation

References

 
African national association football teams
National sports teams established in 1964